Orthotylus palustris is a species of bug in the Miridae family that is can be found in Albania, Croatia, France,  Greece, Italy, Slovenia, and Spain.

References

Insects described in 1888
Hemiptera of Europe
palustris